"Żałuję" is a first solo single from Polish singer Ewelina Flinta. This song was one of the most popular songs in Poland in 2003. "Żałuję" is cover of song "Sama", originally sung by Serbian pop artist Ana Stanić and written by Mirko Vukomanovic.

A Czech version was recorded and released in 2004 by Aneta Langerová as "Skvělej nápad".

Charts

2003 singles
Ewelina Flinta songs
1998 songs
Sony BMG singles